In astronomy, position angle (usually abbreviated PA) is the convention for measuring angles on the sky. The International Astronomical Union defines it as the angle measured relative to the north celestial pole (NCP), turning positive into the direction of the right ascension. In the standard (non-flipped) images, this is a counterclockwise measure relative to the axis into the direction of positive declination.

In the case of observed visual binary stars, it is defined as the angular offset of the secondary star from the primary relative to the north celestial pole.

As the example illustrates, if one were observing a hypothetical binary star with a PA of 135°, that means an imaginary line in the eyepiece drawn from the north celestial pole to the primary (P) would be offset from the secondary (S) such that the  angle would be 135°.

When graphing visual binaries, the NCP is, as in the illustration, normally drawn from the center point (origin) that is the Primary downward–that is, with north at bottom–and PA is measured counterclockwise. Also, the direction of the proper motion can, for example, be given by its position angle.

The definition of position angle is also applied to extended objects like galaxies, where it refers to the angle made by the major axis of the object with the NCP line.

Nautics
The concept of the position angle is inherited from nautical navigation on the oceans, where the optimum compass course is the course from a known position  to a target position  with minimum effort. Setting aside the influence of winds and ocean currents, the optimum course is the course of smallest distance between the two positions on the ocean surface. Computing the compass course is known as the inverse problem of geodesics.

Global geocentric coordinate system

Detailed evaluation of the optimum direction is possible if the sea surface is approximated by a sphere surface. The standard computation places the ship at a geodetic latitude  and geodetic longitude , where  is considered positive if north of the equator, and where  is considered positive if east of Greenwich. In the global coordinate system centered at the center of the sphere, the Cartesian components are

and the target position is

The North Pole is at

It is calculated in a plane that contains the sphere center and the great circle,

where  is the angular distance of two points viewed from the center of the sphere, measured in radians. The cosine of the angle is calculated by the dot product  of the two vectors

If the ship steers straight to the North Pole, the travel distance is

Brief Derivation
The cosine formula of spherical trigonometry yields for the 

The sine formula yields

Long Derivation

The axis is perpendicular to the plane of the great circle and computed by the normalized vector cross product of the two positions:

A right-handed tilted coordinate system with the center at the center of the sphere is given by the
following three axes: the
axis , the axis

and the axis .
A position along the great circle is

The angle  is given by splitting this direction along two orthogonal directions in the plane tangential to the sphere at the point .

 points north and  points east at the position .
The position angle  projects 
into these two directions,
,
where the positive sign means the positive position angles are defined to be north over east.

of the arguments:

If atan2 is used to compute the value, one can reduce both expressions by division through 
because these values are always positive and that operation does not change signs; then effectively

See also
Parallactic angle
Angular distance

Further reading

References

External links
The Orbits of 150 Visual Binary Stars, by Dibon Smith (Accessed 2/26/06)

Astronomical coordinate systems
Angle
Observational astronomy